Girlguiding Scotland is part of the worldwide Guiding movement. It is the country's largest voluntary organisation for girls and young women with 61,375 members in 3,500 units throughout Scotland.

History
The origins of the Guiding and Scouting movement date back to Allison Greenlees then Allison Cargill at Laurel Bank School. She started the Cuckoo Patrol, after reading an edition of Scouting for Boys and wanted something like the Boy Scouts to be available to girls. In 1907 when Robert Baden-Powell formed the Boy Scouts as a training organization for boys. The Cuckoo Patrol was the first Patrol of Girl Scouts in Scotland was formed in Glasgow in 1908 with links to the 1st Glasgow Scout Patrol, similar patrols were being set up all over the UK. This led to a more specific demand for "something for the girls" at the Crystal Palace Rally in 1910.

The first registered Girl Guides in Scotland were the 1st Peebles Patrol formed in 1910 and was founded by Lady Erskine. The first meeting occurred on 26 February 1910 at Venlaw Castle, Tweeddale. The Girl Guides were officially launched in the same year by Baden-Powell's sister Agnes Baden-Powell, and Imperial Headquarters set up. A Scottish Headquarters Committee was formed in 1912 and the Girl Guide movement established in Scotland. The Girl Guides Association for Scotland was established in 1933 with its own constitution.

Administration

Girlguiding Scotland has active units in six regions that cover all of Scotland:

The six regions are further subdivided into a total of 38 geographical counties plus a 39th non-geographical county for Lone members. These in turn are divided into divisions, divisions may then be split into districts. Each district comprises a number of individual units covering all sections. How districts and divisions work together varies and is dependent on a number of factors- location, number of units and members, historic tradition and events and current leadership teams and may change over time. Each area works towards delivering the best Guiding experience for their particular circumstances under the overall guidance from Girlguiding Scotland and Girlguiding UK.

Regions and counties

The 39 counties are arranged in the following format

Lothian and Borders Region
 Edinburgh, East Lothian,  West Lothian, Midlothian, Roxburghshire, Tweed Valley, Berwickshire

Central Region
 Fife, Forth Valley, Clackmannanshire, Angus, Perth & Kinross, Dundee

Strathclyde Region
 City of Glasgow, Renfrewshire, East Renfrewshire, Dumbartonshire, North Lanarkshire, West Lanarkshire, South Lanarkshire

Highlands & Islands Region
 Shetland, Orkney, Western Isles, Caithness, Sutherland, Ross-shire, Inverness-shire, Argyll

Grampian Region
 Aberdeen, Kincardine & Deeside, Gordon, Banff & Buchan, Moray

Ayrshire & South West Region
 Ayrshire North, Ayrshire South, Dumfries-shire, Stewartry of Kirkcudbright, Wigtownshire

The 39th County of Lones is not Geographically located as it provides support Scotland wide and therefore sits separate from the regional structure. In all other ways it is identical to the other counties.

Membership
In 2016 the membership was over 60,000 members and registered volunteers and is the largest voluntary organisation for girls and women in Scotland.

There were approximately 10,000 Rainbows, 22,000 Brownies, 14,000 Guides, 2000 Senior Section young women, and over 9,000 Adult members. About one in three eight-year-old girls in Scotland is a Brownie,  and half the women born in Scotland have belonged to Girlguiding Scotland at some point in their lives.

The adult members give over 1 million hours in voluntary service each year ranging from face to face time with young members through to attending and delivering training, accounts, record-keeping, membership support & planning. This is the equivalent to 550 full-time jobs.

Girlguiding Scotland is a charity and is funded by fundraising, grants, membership subscriptions and a trading arm.

Girlguiding Scotland became independent in 1933 and in 1939 moved its headquarters to Coates Crescent, Edinburgh where it remains today.

The figure head in Scotland is the Scottish Chief Commissioner who serves for a term of five years. Dinah Faulds became Scottish Chief Commissioner on 1 September 2007. She was succeeded by Sue Walker in 2012. The current Scottish Chief Commissioner is Dr Moira Mckenna who took over in 2017.

Girlguiding Scotland Locations

Netherurd is Girlguiding Scotland's home from home in the Scottish Borders. It is a Georgian Mansion in grounds of 30 acres amid the Border Hills of Peeblesshire and was given to the Girl Guides in the 1940s by Major Thomson. The centre includes accommodation in the main house, the Garden House, a small number of new wigwam style cabins and 5 campsites. The centre offers a number of outdoor activity options including high and low ropes courses, water activities and archery; there are facilities to deliver training and indoor activities across the site. The centre is located 25 miles south of Edinburgh and 42 miles from Glasgow.

See also
Girlguiding UK
World Association of Girl Guides and Girl Scouts

References

External links
Girlguiding Scotland, Official Website
Netherurd House

Charities based in Edinburgh
1910 establishments in Scotland
Youth organizations established in 1910
Youth organisations based in Scotland
Girlguiding
Women's organisations based in Scotland